The 2019–20 season was Gabala FK's 15th season, and their 14th in the Azerbaijan Premier League, the top-flight of Azerbaijani football. Gabala will also take part in the Azerbaijan Cup and the Europa League. Gabala finished the season in 8th position due to the premature end of the season and were spared relegation, whilst they were due to play Zira in the Semifinal of the Azerbaijan Cup before its cancellation. In the Europa League Gabala were knocked out by Dinamo Tbilisi in the Second Qualifying Round.

Season events
On 15 June, Gabala announced the signing of Kamal Mirzayev and Sadig Guliyev from Zira, with both players signing one-year contracts.

On 21 June, Gabala signed Fernań López to a one-year contract, with the option of an additional year, from Barakaldo.

On 27 June, Gabala signed Merab Gigauri to a one-year contract from Torpedo Kutaisi.

On 4 July, Gabala signed Christian Kouakou to a one-year contract, with the option of a second, from MFK Karviná.

On 10 July, Gabala signed Clésio to a one-year contract, with the option of a second, from İstanbulspor.

On 19 July, Gabala signed a six-month contract with Ivica Žunić.

On 23 August, new signing Kamal Mirzayev left the club to sign a one-year contract with Al-Salmiya of the Kuwait Premier League.

On 31 August, Sanan Gurbanov resigned as manager following Gabala's 4–0 defeat at home to Keşla.

On 2 September, Gabala announced that Elmar Bakhshiyev had been appointed as the club's caretaker manager.

On 31 October, Gabala announced the signing of Ibrahima Niasse on a contract until the end of the season.

On 7 January, Gabala announced the return of Ehtiram Shahverdiyev on a contract until the summer of 2021.

On 28 January, Niasse left Gabala to sign for PAS Lamia 1964.

On 30 January, Gabala announced the signing of Abdelrafik Gérard on an 18-month contract.

On 4 February, Gabala announced the signing of Nicolas Rajsel on an 18-month contract.

On 11 February, Gabala announced the signing of Rodrigo Gattas, on an 18-month contract.

On 20 February, Gabala announced that they had signed Yaovi Akakpo to a 2.5-year contract at the end of 2019.

On 13 March 2020, the Azerbaijan Premier League was postponed due to the COVID-19 pandemic.

On 21 May 2020, Gabala announced that Amin Seydiyev would leave the club at the end of the season to join Sabah.

On 4 June 2020, Gabala announced that youngsters Samir Maharramli and Idris Ingilabli would also leave the club at the end of the season to join Sabah.

On 19 June 2020, the AFFA announced that the 2019–20 season had been officially ended without the resumption of the remains matches due to the escalating situation of the COVID-19 pandemic in Azerbaijan.

Squad

Out on loan

Transfers

In

 Transfer announced on the above date.

Out

 Transfer announced on the above date, coming into effect at the end of the season.

Loans out

Released

Trial

Friendlies

Competitions

Premier League

Results summary

Results by round

Results

League table

Azerbaijan Cup

UEFA Europa League

Qualifying rounds

Squad statistics

Appearances and goals

|-
|colspan="14"|Players away from Gabala on loan:
|-
|colspan="14"|Players who left Gabala during the season:

|}

Goal scorers

Clean sheets

Disciplinary record

References

External links 
Gabala FC Website

Gabala FC seasons
Gabala
Azerbaijani football clubs 2019–20 season